SM U-22 was one of 329 submarines serving in the Imperial German Navy in World War I. U-22 was engaged in commerce war as part of the naval warfare, during the First Battle of the Atlantic.

U-22 had a career of 14 patrols, sinking 43 ships for a total of 46,521 tons. In addition, she damaged three ships totalling 8,988 tons, and captured 1 prize worth 1,170 tons.

Oblt.z.S. Hashagen was the most successful, sinking 28 of the vessels, the largest being the British passenger steamer California at 5,629 tons. She was sunk  NWxN3/4N of Cape Villano on 17 October 1917.

U-22 was surrendered to the Allies at Harwich on 1 December 1918 in accordance with the requirements of the Armistice with Germany. She was sold (with one of her engines) by the British Admiralty to Hughes Bolckow on 3 March 1919 for £2,975, and was broken up at Blyth between 25 April 1919 and 1922.

Summary of raiding history

References

Notes

Citations

External links
Photographs of U-18 in 1918

Bibliography

World War I submarines of Germany
Type U 19 submarines
1913 ships
U-boats commissioned in 1913
Ships built in Danzig